Escape Route is a 1952 British black-and-white thriller film, directed by Seymour Friedman and Peter Graham Scott, and starring George Raft, Sally Gray and Clifford Evans.

The film was known in the US as I'll Get You (not to be confused with an earlier Raft film, I'll Get You for This).

The film is largely filmed in the streets of London.

Plot
An American, Steve Rossi, enters Britain by slipping past immigration at Heathrow Airport, leading to a national manhunt by the police led by Scotland Yard. 

Rossi heads into London where he tracks down Bailey, a barman in a cocktail bar, and asks him about Michael Grand. The barman passes him a note with an address which leads him to a woman, who says she does not know Grand. She agrees to change his US currency and buy him a coat while he waits in her flat. For money, she gives him another address: Kingston House, a swanky block of flats on Kingston Road. He takes a taxi there.

Their he meets Joan Miller who says yes it is Grand's flat but she is his secretary and he is not there. She claims that Grand is not going to return, but calls Grand who agrees to meet. Rossi wants to stay put in Grand's flat but Joan pulls a gun on him and together they drive to an old terraced house where Rossi meets Wilkes who starts quizzing Rossi.

Rossi says that Grand offered him a job, working on aircraft design. Joan is asked to accommodate Rossi in her own flat.

Meanwhile the police post Rossi's picture in all the newspapers and quiz various underworld figures to try to locate him. The taxi driver recognises the picture.

Joan Miller is revealed to be an MI5 agent. Rossi reveals himself to be an FBI agent posing as a nuclear scientist in an attempt to infiltrate a gang kidnapping western scientists and taking them across the Iron Curtain. Grand has recently arranged the kidnap of an American. With MI5's assistance, Rossi monitors Grand and arranges a meeting with him. Growing increasingly suspicious of Rossi, Grand and his organisation make several attempts to kill him.

Rossi and Joan follow Irma Brookes, Grand's female assistant in an attempt to find him. Irma Brookes and a body with some of Grand's ID is found in a burned out car.

Rossi is caught and taken to Hammersmith Police Station. It is explained that Rossi wanted to get into the papers so that Grand would be aware of his presence.

Rossi cannot identify the body in the mortuary as Grand as he is unsure of his appearance.

The viewer finally sees Grand when Max, another taxi driver, informs him of what he has seen both at the burning car and near the mortuary.

Rossi dons a naval uniform and tails Grand on foot through empty streets in the city, leaving a chalk trail of markers for Joan to follow. Grand goes to the River Thames where the low tide allows him to walk along the edge. They end at the Old Swan Pier near London Bridge. Grand pulls a gun and a scuffle begins. Grand escapes to a rooftop of a grain elevator close to The Monument. They end up fighting on an external freight lift heading back to the ground. Rossi wins and the police arrive.

Cast
 George Raft as Steve Rossi 
 Sally Gray as Joan Miller 
 Clifford Evans as Michael Grand 
 Frederick Piper as Inspector Reid 
 Reginald Tate as Colonel Wilkes 
 Patricia Laffan as Irma Brookes 
 June Ashley as Beauty Shop Attendant 
 John Warwick as Security Chief Brice 
 Roddy Hughes as Porter
 Grace Arnold as Neighbour 
 Cyril Chamberlain as Bailey 
 Howard Douglas as Taxi Driver 
 Arthur Lovegrove as Phillips
 Anthony Pendrell as Rees 
 Norman Pierce as Inspector Hobbs 
 Harry Towb as Immigration Officer

Production
It was made at Walton Studios and on location around London, mostly in the City of London, at a time when there was still much bomb damage from the Second World War. American actress Coleen Gray was reported to have been cast opposite Raft, but the role was eventually played by the English star Sally Gray. It was one of several films made by British companies in connection with the low-budget American outfit Lippert Pictures, which distributed the film in the United States. It was made on a larger budget than most Lippert releases.

Reception
The Los Angeles Times said the film was "so mysterious" the filmmakers "almost succeeded in keeping the story to themselves."

References

Bibliography
 Aaker, Everett. George Raft: The Films. McFarland, 2013.

External links

Review at Variety

1952 films
1950s spy thriller films
British spy thriller films
British black-and-white films
Cold War spy films
Films directed by Peter Graham Scott
Films directed by Seymour Friedman
Films shot at Nettlefold Studios
Films set in London
Films shot in London
1950s English-language films
1950s British films